Pornography in Bangladesh is forbidden. It is against the law to watch, produce, distribute, or possess pornography, since the Pornography Control Act has been passed in 2012.

Types of publication

Print
Erotic novels, which sometimes included illustrations, are popularly known as choti, are sold by small roadside book shops.

Internet
In 2009 a report found increase in production of child pornography. In 2013 a study found that over 30 million Taka worth of pornography is downloaded per month in Cyber Cafes in Dhaka, Bangladesh. The report also found 77 percent of pornography viewers were underage.

In 2015 the High Court of Bangladesh asked the government to stop pornographic material in social media. In 2016 Bangladesh Government Minister, Tarana Halim, has announced plans to block internet porn sites in Bangladesh. Information and telecommunications minister of 11th parliamentary government of Bangladesh, Mostafa Zabbar, blocked nearly 20,000 porn websites access in Bangladesh from November 2018 to February 2019.

Legality
The Pornography Control act of 2012 criminalized pornography. The possession, distribution, production, and using of pornographic material was made illegal. The maximum punishment under current law is 10 years in jail and/or 500 thousand Taka fine.

Socio-cultural attitudes
The laws have been welcomed by most Bangladeshi. But critics say though the law will deter blackmailing and exploitation it would be very hard to police. In 2012, the Press Secretary to the Prime Minister of Bangladesh, Abul Kalam Azad, said "pornography has spread like a disease in Bangladesh". Pornography is viewed negatively and is blamed for making children "perverts".

See also

 Internet censorship in Bangladesh
 Prostitution in Bangladesh
 Pornography in Asia

References

Bang
Law of Bangladesh
Bang